Insight is an album by saxophonist/flautist Prince Lasha which was recorded in England in 1966 and originally released on the CBS label.

Reception 

Allmusic awarded the album 4 stars with its review by Thom Jurek stating: "this is not an exploratory outside date, but a straight-ahead session of originals and standards, divided between uptempo numbers and ballads.  ...For all its traditionalism, this is indeed a major date for Lasha and reveals how deeply ensconced he was in the bop and swing lineages".

Track listing 
All compositions by Prince Lasha except as indicated
 "Nuttin Out Jones" - 6:16
 "Out of Nowhere" (Johnny Green, Edward Heyman) - 7:37
 "Body & Soul" (Green, Heyman, Frank Eyton, Robert Sour) - 6:32
 "Impressions of Eric Dolphy" - 7:06
 "Everything Happens to Me" (Tom Adair, Matt Dennis) - 5:23
 "Just Friends" (John Klenner, Sam M. Lewis) - 6:54

Personnel 
Prince Lasha - alto saxophone, flute
Chris Bateson - trumpet
John Mumford - trombone
David Snell - harp
Mike Carr, Stan Tracey - piano
Bruce Cale, Dave Willis, Jeff Clyne, Rick Laird  - bass
Joe Oliver - drums

References 

Prince Lasha albums
1966 albums
CBS Records albums